Frederick Houk Law (1871–1957) was an American schoolteacher and author. He traveled widely, crossing Europe by bicycle, journeying in Africa from Cape Town to Cairo, and later to the interior of British Guiana.

He wrote short stories for pulp fiction magazines such as Munsey's.

He taught English at Stuyvesant High School, New York.

Books
Law fiction and nonfiction books.

Non-fiction

Modern great Americans: short biographies of twenty great Americans of modern times who won wide recognition for achievements in various types of activity
Civilization builders
Mastery of speech, a course in eight parts on general speech, business talking and public speaking, what to say and how to say it under all conditions

Fiction

 The Heart of Sindhra (1898)

References

External links
 

Pulp fiction writers
Schoolteachers from New York (state)
1871 births
1957 deaths